The 1961–62 season was Cardiff City F.C.'s 35th season in the Football League. They competed in the 22-team Division One, then the first tier of English football, finishing twenty-first, suffering relegation to Division Two. The 1961–62 season remained the last time Cardiff City appeared in the top tier of the English league system until promotion to Premier League after the 2012–13 season.

Players

League standings

Results by round

Fixtures and results

First Division

League Cup

FA Cup

Welsh Cup

See also

Cardiff City F.C. seasons

References

Welsh Football Data Archive

Cardiff City F.C. seasons
Card
Card